A water ball or water walking ball is a large inflatable sphere that allows a person inside it to walk across the surface of a body of water. The giant ball is usually two metres in diameter and has a zippered entrance to allow for easy entry and exit. The water ball is similar to the zorb but it has only one layer and is designed for water travel rather than down-hill rolling. In the United Kingdom, the balls have been used at swimming pools, marinas and lakes in an effort to keep children fit.

History 

One of the first water balls appeared in the film Diamonds Are Forever (1971) and in the Beach Boys music video, Getcha Back (1985). Charles Blane Jones designed the first water ball for public distribution in 1998.

Safety 
The United States Government has warned of the dangers of using the balls, saying it "does not know of any safe way" to avoid the dangers of suffocation and drowning, among other hazards. There are recorded instances of children fainting and crashing onto hard surfaces while inside the balls, and the U.S. Consumer Product Safety Commission has encouraged amusement ride officials not to allow their use. The Commission chairman declared an intention to pursue the safety investigation further.

Charles Jones from Oklahoma developed a water ball commercially in 1998. He was invited by a British reporter to visit London to demonstrate the ball on a lake. As soon as he attempted to walk across the water, he lost his balance and fell. The ball deflated and filled rapidly with icy water. He was saved from sinking below the surface when an assistant dragged the ball back to dry land using a safety line, witnessed by a crowd of tourists.

The U.S. Consumer Product Safety Commission has warned of the dangers of the balls being used in a safe manner. The Commission is aware of two unconfirmed incidents involving water balls. In one, a child was found unresponsive after being inside the ball for a very brief period of time. In the second incident, a person inside the ball suffered a fracture when it fell out of a shallow, above-ground pool onto hard ground.

Construction 

Many water balls are constructed from polyvinyl chloride (PVC) 0.8–1.0 mm thick. Thermoplastic polyurethanes (TPU) are the best choice for use in cold weather or on snow. Some water balls are made from a PVC–TPU mix. More expensive balls use 100% TPU. Balls are typically made in China, and come in various sizes. A typical water ball stores flat and weighs 15 kilograms, and can be inflated in under a minute with a good air pump. Some models also have hand grips on the inside or outside, and the surface can be printed on.

See also

 Zorbing
 Hamster ball
 List of inflatable manufactured goods

References

1990s toys
Balls
Physical activity and dexterity toys
Inflatable manufactured goods
Water rides
Water toys

ru:Зорбинг#Гидрозорбинг